State Highway 60 (SH 60) is a state route running from Wallis to Matagorda, Texas.  The route was designated on August 21, 1923, from Wharton to Matagorda, previously numbered SH 12C. On June 8, 1925, SH 60 was extended north to East Bernard. On July 27, 1925, SH 60 was extended north to Wallis. On December 17, 1929, the section from East Bernard to Wallis was to be cancelled when resurfacing on this section is done. On December 12, 1931, the section from East Bernard to Wallis was cancelled as resurfacing was completed. On May 27, 1932, the section from Wallis to East Bernard was to be restored when right-of-way was acquired. On April 10, 1934, that section was restored, as right-of-way was acquired.

Junction list

References

060
Transportation in Austin County, Texas
Transportation in Matagorda County, Texas
Transportation in Wharton County, Texas